Dolni Disan is a village in the municipality of Negotino, North Macedonia. It is located in the Povardarie wine-growing region.

Demographics
According to the statistics of Bulgarian ethnographer Vasil Kanchov from 1900, 1556 inhabitants lived in Dolni Disan, 1200 Muslim Bulgarians, 350 Christian Bulgarians and 6 Romani. According to the 2002 census, the village had a total of 931 inhabitants. Ethnic groups in the village include:

Macedonians 903
Turks 15
Serbs 6
Other 7

References

Villages in Negotino Municipality